West Rosendale is an unincorporated community in the town of Rosendale, Fond du Lac County, Wisconsin, United States.

Notable people
Notable people that were born or lived in West Rosendale include:
Henry C. Bottum (1826–1913), farmer and politician
William T. Innis (1826–1901), Wisconsin legislator and farmer

Notes

Unincorporated communities in Fond du Lac County, Wisconsin
Unincorporated communities in Wisconsin